Rohde & Schwarz Federal Systems, Inc. is a U.S. company set up to distribute Rohde & Schwarz products and services for U.S. government and contractor customers.  Rohde & Schwarz Federal Systems is organized as an SSA company.

History
Rohde & Schwarz Federal Systems, Inc.  was founded in 2008 as an SSA company.  It focuses on serving the US government and contractor community.  The company moved to its location in Annapolis Junction, MD in 2008.

Outside Directors
Rear Admiral, US Navy (Ret.) William R. Morris
Major General, US Army (Ret.) John G. Meyer, Jr.
Joe Longworth
John Montgomery

Product Categories
Rohde & Schwarz Federal Systems distributes all Rohde & Schwarz products including:
Test & Measurement:  RF Amplifiers, Oscilloscopes, Signal Generators, Signal Analyzers, Network Analyzers, Power Meters, Wireless Communication Testers, and Wireless Drive Test.
Secure Communications:  Tactical, Airborne, and Marine Radios.
Broadcasting & Studio Technology:   Terrestrial Radio & Television Transmission Equipment & Studio Development Tools
Radiomonitoring & Direction Finding:  Antennas, Receivers, Mobile and Fixed Direction Finding.
IT Security:  Next Generation Firewall, Ethernet Encryptors, Mobile Device Encryption, CryptoServer

Major Competitors
Test & Measurement:  Agilent Technologies, Anritsu, Anite, Aeroflex, National Instruments, Tektronix
Secure Communications:  Rockwell Collins, Harris, Thales
Broadcasting & Studio Technology:  Axcera, Harris
Radiomonitoring & Direction Finding:  DRS, TCI International, L-3, Argon ST, Raytheon, Boeing DRTI, ITT Excelis, CRFS
IT Security:  Palo Alto Networks, Safenet, General Dynamics C4S, Thales

Location
Rohde & Schwarz Federal Systems, Inc.

302 Sentinel Drive #105

Annapolis Junction, MD  20701

Community Activity
Rohde & Schwarz Federal Systems, Inc. sponsors the National Cryptological Museum Foundation.

References

External links

 The National Cryptologic Museum Foundation

Electronic test equipment manufacturers
Radio-frequency identification
Radio navigation